Balangao or Balangaw (also called Balangao Bontoc) is an Austronesian language spoken in northern Luzon, Philippines. It is spoken in the central area of Mountain Province, and into Tanudan municipality of Kalinga Province.

Phonology
Balangao has the following phoneme inventory:

The central vowels /a/ and /ɨ/ each have a lowered and a raised allophone, viz. ~ for /a/, and ~ for /ɨ/. 

References

Languages of Mountain Province
South–Central Cordilleran languages